David Ross (born November 16, 1940) is an American sports shooter. He competed in the men's 50 metre rifle, prone event at the 1976 Summer Olympics.

References

1940 births
Living people
American male sport shooters
Olympic shooters of the United States
Shooters at the 1976 Summer Olympics
Sportspeople from New York City
Pan American Games medalists in shooting
Pan American Games gold medalists for the United States
Shooters at the 1967 Pan American Games
20th-century American people
21st-century American people